Yeni Boğaziçi Spor Kulübü is a Turkish Cypriot sports club established in 1933 and based in Ayios Seryios, Northern Cyprus.

History

Colours 
A.k.a. Yeni Boğaziçi Doğanspor, the club have a Turkish Cypriot-based team and also an English-based team. The English-based team have achieved a lot of success in the recent months winning the league cup and are favourites to lift the league trophy. The under 14s in England are also a success story in their first season they reached the league cup final losing 4-3 to a last minute extra time goal.

Stadium 

The club's home stadium is Yeni Boğaziçi Stadı.

References  

Football clubs in Nicosia
Football clubs in Northern Cyprus